Wanted may refer to:

Law enforcement
 Fugitive, a person wanted by the authorities
 Wanted poster, a poster put up to inform the public of one or more criminals whom authorities wish to apprehend

Film
 Wanted!, a 1937 British comedy film
 Wanted (1967 film), an Italian western
 Wanted (2004 film), an Indian Malayalam-language thriller
 Wanted (2008 film), an American action film based on the comics series (see below)
 Wanted (2009 film), a Bollywood film starring Salman Khan
 Wanted (2010 film), an Indian Bengali film starring Jeet
 Wanted (2011 film), a Tollywood film starring Gopichand
 Wanted (2015 film), an American Western pornographic film

Literature
 Wanted (comics), a 2003–2005 comic book limited series by Mark Millar and J. G. Jones
 Wanted (manga), a 2005 Japanese manga series by Matsuri Hino
 Wanted (Pretty Little Liars), a 2010 Pretty Little Liars novel by Sara Shepard
 Wanted, a 2006 Hardy Boys Undercover Brothers Super Mysteries novel
 Wanted!, a 1992 manga by Eiichiro Oda

Music

Artists
 Wanted (band), a 2004–2012 South Korean boy band

Albums
 Wanted (Bow Wow album), 2005
 Wanted (Cliff Richard album), 2001
 Wanted (Dara Maclean album) or the title song, 2013
 Wanted (Wande Coal album) or the title song, 2015
 Wanted (Yazz album), 1988
 Wanted! The Outlaws, by Waylon Jennings, Willie Nelson, Jessi Colter, and Tompall Glaser, 1976
 Wanted: Original Motion Picture Soundtrack, from the 2008 film
 Wanted, by Jayne Denham, 2021

Songs
 "Wanted" (Alan Jackson song), 1990
 "Wanted" (The Dooleys song), 1979
 "Wanted" (Hunter Hayes song), 2011
 "Wanted" (Jessie James song), 2009
 "Wanted" (NOTD and Daya song), 2019
 "Wanted" (OneRepublic song), 2019
 "Wanted" (Perry Como song), 1954
 "Wanted" (Tiwa Savage song), 2013
 "Wanted (Shimei Tehai)", by Pink Lady, 1977
 "Wanted", by the Cranberries from Everybody Else Is Doing It, So Why Can't We?, 1993
 "Wanted", by Todrick Hall from Forbidden, 2018
 "Wanted", by Vanessa Carlton from Be Not Nobody, 2002
 "Wanted", by White Town from Women in Technology, 1997

Television

Programs and series
 Wanted (1955 TV program), a program that debuted on the 1955–56 United States network television schedule
 Wanted (game show), a 1996–1997 UK reality competition series
 Wanted (2005 TV series), an American police drama
 Wanted (2013 TV program), an Australian true crime show
 Wanted (2016 Australian TV series), a drama series
 Wanted (South Korean TV series), a 2016 crime thriller series
 Wanted sa Radyo, a Philippine public service program

Episodes
"Wanted" (NCIS: Los Angeles), 2013
"Wanted" (Only Fools and Horses), 1983

Video games
 Wanted: Dead, a hybrid slasher/shooter developed by Soleil Ltd. and published by 110 Industries SA, creators of Ninja Gaiden and Dead or Alive
 Wanted (video game), a 1989 third-person, shoot 'em up arcade game
Wanted: Weapons of Fate, a game based on the 2008 film

See also
 Classified ad, a want ad
 Wanted Dead or Alive (disambiguation)
 
 Want (disambiguation)
 The Wanted (disambiguation)
 Unwanted (disambiguation)